Early College Academy may refer to:

 Dayton Early College Academy, in Dayton, Ohio
 Gilroy Early College Academy, in Gilroy, California